Taipana is a comune (municipality) in the Province of Udine in the Italian region Friuli-Venezia Giulia, located about  northwest of Trieste and about  northeast of Udine, on the border with Slovenia. According to the census 1971 74,4% of the population are Slovenes.

Taipana borders the following municipalities: Attimis, Kobarid (Slovenia), Faedis, Lusevera, Nimis.

Demographic evolution

References

See also 
Venetian Slovenia
Slovene Lands
Friuli

Cities and towns in Friuli-Venezia Giulia